Very Best of 2nd Chapter of Acts is a 2006 compilation album by Contemporary Christian music group 2nd Chapter of Acts released under the Sparrow label.

Track listing

 "Last Day of My Life" - 3:09
 "Yahweh" - 3:22
 "Prince Song" - 2:51
 "Which Way the Wind Blows" - 4:41
 "Easter Song" - 2:38
 "Humble Yourself" - 3:58
 "Mansion Builder" - 3:10
 "Rod and Staff" - 2:58
 "Takin' the Easy Way" - 4:02
 "Night Light" - 3:30
 "Are You Goin' to Narnia" - 3:26
 "Well, Haven't You Heard" - 3:55
source:

References

2nd Chapter of Acts albums
2006 compilation albums